The Hong Kong Accounting Standards, or HKAS for short, formerly HKSSAP, is a set of accounting standards issued by the Hong Kong Institute of Certified Public Accountants.

Details
HKAS 1 Presentation of Financial statements
HKAS 2 Inventories
HKAS 7 Cash flow statements
HKAS 8 Accounting Policies, Changes in Accounting Estimates
HKAS 10 Events after the Reporting Period
HKAS 11 Construction contracts
HKAS 12 Income taxes
HKAS 14 Segment reporting
HKAS 16 Property, Plant and Equipment
HKAS 17 Leases
HKAS 18 Revenue
HKAS 19 Employee benefits
HKAS 20 Accounting for government grants and disclosure of government assistance
HKAS 21 The Effects of Changes in Foreign exchange rates
HKAS 23 Borrowing Costs
HKAS 24 Related Party Disclosures
HKAS 26 Accounting and Reporting by Retirement Benefit Plans
HKAS 27 Consolidated and Separate Financial Statements
HKAS 28 Investments in Associates
HKAS 29 Financial Reporting in Hyperinflationary Economies
HKAS 30 Disclosures in the Financial Statements of Banks and Similar Financial Institutions
HKAS 31 Investments in Joint Ventures
HKAS 32 Financial instruments: Disclosure and Presentation
HKAS 33 Earnings per share
HKAS 34 Interim Financial Reporting
HKAS 36 Impairment of Assets
HKAS 37 Provisions, contingent liabilities and contingent assets
HKAS 38 Intangible assets
HKAS 39 Financial Instruments: Recognition and Measurement
HKAS 40 Investment Property
HKAS 41 Agriculture

See also
 International Financial Reporting Standards

References
HKICPA e-Handbook System

Accounting in Hong Kong
Accounting principles by country